Roby Calvin Thompson (March 30, 1898 – July 29, 1960) was a United States district judge of the United States District Court for the Western District of Virginia.

Education and career

Thompson was born in Saltville, Virginia, Thompson received a Bachelor of Laws from University of Virginia School of Law in 1922. He was in private practice of law in Abingdon, Virginia from 1922 to 1957. He was a deputy clerk of the United States District Court in Abingdon from 1928 to 1938. He was commonwealth attorney of Washington County, Virginia from 1939 to 1947. He was city attorney of Abingdon from 1940 to 1957.

Federal judicial service

Thompson was nominated by President Dwight D. Eisenhower on August 16, 1957, to a seat on the United States District Court for the Western District of Virginia vacated by Judge Alfred D. Barksdale. He was confirmed by the United States Senate on August 28, 1957, and received his commission on August 30, 1957. He served as Chief Judge from 1958 to 1960. His service was terminated on July 29, 1960, due to his death in Abingdon.

Notable cases

Along with his colleague Theodore Roosevelt Dalton and Senior Judge John Paul Jr., Thompson presided over school integration cases in Western Virginia, implementing the Supreme Court's decision in Brown v. Board of Education. Thompson ordered the integration of the public schools in Floyd County, Virginia and Galax, Virginia in 1959 and Pulaski County, Virginia in 1960, noting that more than five years had passed since the Brown decision.

References

Sources
 

1898 births
1960 deaths
Virginia lawyers
Judges of the United States District Court for the Western District of Virginia
United States district court judges appointed by Dwight D. Eisenhower
20th-century American judges
University of Virginia School of Law alumni
People from Abingdon, Virginia
County and city Commonwealth's Attorneys in Virginia